Metaboric acid is the name for a family of inorganic compounds with the same empirical formula HBO2. that differ in their molecular structure.  They are colourless water-soluble solids  formed by the dehydration or decomposition of boric acid.

Metaboric acid is formally the parent acid of the metaborate anions.

Structure

The main forms of metaboric acid are:

 Modification III, or trimeric, with the molecular formula . The molecule has C3h symmetry, with a six-member ring of alternating boron and oxygen atoms at the core, with  groups attached to the borons.  The crystal structure is orthorhombic with a sheet-like structure, similar to that of boric acid itself. It is obtained by heating orthoboric acid at 80-100 °C, with loss of water:

3   →     +  3 

 Modification II. A polymer with structure similar to modification III, except that the rings are connected and 1/3 of the boron centres are tetrahedral. The molecular formula is therefore  The crystal structure is monoclinic. This form has a higher melting point (201 °C) and density (2.045 g/cm3)  It is obtained by heating the trimeric form at 130-140 °C in a sealed ampoule (to prevent dehydration), orthorhombic metaboric acid converts to the monoclinic form (II):

 Cubic form. It is a white solid and is only slightly soluble in water that melts at about 236 °C. It is obtained by heating either modification II or III above 140 °C.

Reactions

When heated above about 170 °C, metaboric acid dehydrates, forming tetraboric acid, also called pyroboric acid (H2B4O7):

 4 HBO2 → H2B4O7 +

Metaborates
Metaborates are derivatives of BO2−.  Like metaboric acid, the metaborates exist with disparate structures. Examples are sodium and potassium metaborates, salts formed by deprotonation of orthorhombic metaboric acid containing the cyclic B3O63− ion and calcium metaborate, Ca(BO2)2, which contains the chain polymeric ion (BO2−)n.

References 

 

Borates
Inorganic polymers